Dépri Cyrille Léandre Domoraud (born 22 July 1971) is an Ivorian former professional footballer who played as a defender. He also holds French nationality and spent most of his career in Western Europe. He played in 3 of the 5 top leagues in the UEFA: Serie A, La Liga and Ligue 1. At international level, he represented Ivory Coast.

Club career
Domoraud started his career at France for clubs in the suburbs of Paris: Créteil and Red Star Saint-Ouen. In 1996, he joined Girondins de Bordeaux of Ligue 1, where he played 31 league appearances. In the next season, he signed for Olympique de Marseille, where he played at 1999 UEFA Cup Final.

Italy
He was signed by Italian team Internazionale in 1999. He played just 6 league matches, with 5 of them being in the first two and a half months of the season. He also played in the league playoffs for the UEFA Cup, in the 2nd leg of the 1999–2000 Coppa Italia final and in the 2000 Supercoppa Italiana. On 18 September 2000, he was loaned out to Ligue 1 club SC Bastia.

During the 2000–01 season, Domoraud moved to cross-town rivals AC Milan, in exchange with Thomas Helveg. He was tagged for 22,000 million lire (€11,362,052) and Helveg undisclosed.

Espanyol
In August 2002, Domoraud left for La Liga side Espanyol. He was a regular in the team, and played 69 times in the Spanish top division.

Late career
In August 2004, Domoraud signed a two-year contract with Turkish Süper Lig side Konyaspor. He played just 4 league matches before terminating his contract in January 2005. He returned to his first professional club Créteil and played 58 league matches in two and a half Ligue 2 seasons. He then returned to Ivory Coast for Stella Club d'Adjamé and Africa Sports.

International career
Domoraud holds the distinction of being the oldest player on the 2006 World Cup Ivory Coast national football team, and the most experienced with 47 international caps.

Coaching career
In 2001, Domoraud founded his own football school in Bouaké, the Cyril Domoraud Centre. On 28 May 2010, he was named as assistant coach of Sven-Göran Eriksson by the Ivory Coast national football team for the 2010 World Cup.

Personal life
Domoraud became a Christian in 1999. He is the older brother of Gilles and Jean-Jacques.

Honours
Ivory Coast
Africa Cup of Nations runner-up:2006

References

External links
 
 
 
 
 Inter Archive

Ivorian footballers
Ivory Coast international footballers
French sportspeople of Ivorian descent
2006 FIFA World Cup players
1996 African Cup of Nations players
1998 African Cup of Nations players
2000 African Cup of Nations players
2006 Africa Cup of Nations players
US Créteil-Lusitanos players
Red Star F.C. players
FC Girondins de Bordeaux players
Olympique de Marseille players
Inter Milan players
SC Bastia players
Ivorian expatriate sportspeople in Italy
A.C. Milan players
AS Monaco FC players
RCD Espanyol footballers
Konyaspor footballers
Africa Sports d'Abidjan players
Ligue 1 players
Ivorian expatriate sportspeople in Turkey
Ivorian expatriate sportspeople in Spain
Ligue 2 players
Serie A players
La Liga players
Süper Lig players
Expatriate footballers in France
Expatriate footballers in Italy
Expatriate footballers in Spain
Expatriate footballers in Turkey
Expatriate footballers in Monaco
Ivorian expatriate footballers
Ivorian emigrants to France
Association football defenders
1971 births
Living people
Stella Club d'Adjamé players
People from Gôh-Djiboua District